Shadeville High School was located at 87 Andrew Hargrett, Sr., Road, Shadeville, Florida,  east of Crawfordville, Florida. It was built in 1931 and was the first and only high school for black people in Wakulla County, Florida. It was closed with school desegregation in 1967, when a new Wakulla High School was built. The building was demolished; there is a historical marker. Shadeville Elementary School continues operating.

Andrew J. Hargrett, Sr. helped establish the school.

A historical marker commemorates the school.

References

Historically segregated African-American schools in Florida
High schools in Wakulla County, Florida
Defunct public high schools in Florida
1931 establishments in Florida
1967 disestablishments in Florida
Defunct black public schools in the United States that closed when schools were integrated
Buildings and structures in Wakulla County, Florida
Demolished buildings and structures in Florida